Kathryn Rose Plummer (born October 16, 1998) is an American professional volleyball player who plays as an outside hitter for the United States women's national volleyball team and the Italian club Imoco Volley.

Early life
Plummer was born to Kevin and Michelle Plummer and grew up in Aliso Viejo, California. She attended Aliso Niguel High School where she played volleyball and graduated in 2016.

Career

College
Plummer was heavily recruited out of high school, getting her first scholarship offer in the 7th grade. She ultimately selected Stanford on a full athletic scholarship. While at Stanford, she helped Stanford win NCAA national championships in 2016, 2018 and 2019. She was named to the NCAA all-tournament team all three years, and won the Most Outstanding Player award in 2018 and 2019. As a freshman, she won National Freshman of the Year by the AVCA, and in 2017 and 2018 she was named the National Player of the Year.

Professional clubs

  Saugella Team Monza (2019–2020)
  Denso Airybees (2020–2021)
  Imoco Volley (2021–)

On December 30, 2019, Plummer signed her first professional contract with Italian side Saugella Team Monza. She made her Serie A debut on January 19 in Monza's 3-2 defeat against Zanetti Bergamo in which she came on as a substitute and scored 9 points. She was the top scorer in Monza's Coppa Italia quarter final upset over Igor Gorgonzola Novara and played a key role for her team to reach their second-ever Coppa Italia final four, where they were eventually defeated by Unet E-Work Busto Arsizio in the semi finals. In CEV Cup, Plummer only played in Monza's 3-1 loss in the second leg of the round of 16 match-up against Dinamo Kazan which resulted their elimination from the competition. On October 2, 2020, Plummer signed with the Denso Airybees. On June 18, 2021, Plummer signed with Imoco Volley.

USA National Team
In May 2021, Plummer was named to the 18-player roster for the FIVB Volleyball Nations League tournament. that was played May 25-June 24 in Rimini, Italy. She led the team with 14 kills and two blocks in her debut, when they swept Dominican Republic in team USA's opening match.

She was a selected as an Olympic alternate for the 2020 Summer Olympics.

Awards and honors

Clubs
 2022 Club World Championship  Champion, with Imoco Volley
 2021 Italian Supercup -  Champions, with Imoco Volley Conegliano
 2021-22 Italian Cup (Coppa Italia) -  Champion, with Imoco Volley Conegliano
 2021–22 Italian League -  Champion, with Imoco Volley Conegliano

College
2016  NCAA Division I National Champions
2018  NCAA Division I National Champions
2019  NCAA Division I National Champions

Senior CLASS Award (2019)
Honda Sports Award for volleyball (2019)
James E. Sullivan Award (2019)
AVCA National Player of the Year (2017, 2018)
AVCA National Freshman of the Year (2016)
NCAA Most Outstanding Player (2018, 2019)

International

2019  Pan-American Cup

References

1998 births
Living people
Volleyball players from Long Beach, California
Sportspeople from Aliso Viejo, California
Outside hitters
American women's volleyball players
James E. Sullivan Award recipients
Stanford Cardinal women's volleyball players
Denso Airybees players
American expatriate sportspeople in Japan
American expatriate sportspeople in Italy
Aliso Niguel High School alumni
Expatriate volleyball players in Italy
Opposite hitters
Serie A1 (women's volleyball) players
Expatriate volleyball players in Japan